Waldo Lake Wilderness is a wilderness area surrounding Waldo Lake in the central Oregon Cascades. It is located within the Willamette National Forest.

Geography 

Waldo Lake itself is outside the wilderness boundary, but it is considered one of the purest lakes in the world: vertical visibility can exceed . Within the wilderness are the Six Lakes Basin, Eddeeleo Lakes, Wahanna Lakes, and Quinn Lakes. Waldo Lake Trail, much of which is not in the wilderness boundary, provides a  loop around Waldo Lake. Vegetation in the Waldo Lake Wilderness consists mostly of Douglas-fir, mountain hemlock, and Pacific silver fir.

Recreational activities 
Primary activities in the Waldo Lake Wilderness are hiking, camping, fishing, and boating. Gasoline-powered motor boats on the lake have been banned since 2012 after nearly twelve years of public comment, deliberations, and decision making.

See also 
 List of Oregon Wildernesses
 List of U.S. Wilderness Areas
 Wilderness Act

References

External links 
 GORP - Waldo Lake Wilderness, Oregon
 Willamette National Forest - North Waldo Trail Area
 Willamette National Forest - South Waldo Trail Area

Protected areas of Lane County, Oregon
Wilderness areas of Oregon
Willamette National Forest
1984 establishments in Oregon
Protected areas established in 1984